"Stupid Girl" is a song recorded by the English rock band the Rolling Stones. Written by Mick Jagger and Keith Richards, the song featured on the band's 1966 album Aftermath. It was also issued as the B-side of the U.S. "Paint It Black" single.

Background and writing
Written by Mick Jagger and Keith Richards, "Stupid Girl" is noted for its apparently degrading lyrics towards women, a claim also made about other Stones songs like "Under My Thumb". On the song, Bill Janovitz says in his review,

On the song's lyrics, Richards said in a 1971 interview with Rolling Stone,

When asked about the song and its influences, Jagger said in a 1995 interview with the same magazine, 

"Stupid Girl" was recorded at Los Angeles' RCA Studios on 6–9 March 1966. With Jagger on lead vocals and tambourine, Richards on electric guitars and backing vocals Brian Jones on acoustic. Charlie Watts on drums, while Bill Wyman plays bass. Ian Stewart plays organ on the song while Jack Nitzsche performs electric piano.

It was included on the 1989 compilation Singles Collection: The London Years.

Personnel

According to authors Philippe Margotin and Jean-Michel Guesdon, except where noted:

The Rolling Stones
Mick Jagger vocals
Keith Richards lead guitar, acoustic guitar, backing vocals
Brian Jones rhythm guitar
Bill Wyman bass
Charlie Watts drums

Additional musicians
Ian Stewart Vox Continental
Jack Nitzsche tambourine

References

Sources

External links
Complete official lyrics

The Rolling Stones songs
London Records singles
1966 songs
Songs written by Jagger–Richards
Song recordings produced by Andrew Loog Oldham
Surf rock songs